Ann M. Valentine is an American bioinorganic chemist whose research focuses on biomineralization, the uptake and transport of metals and their medical applications in areas such as cancer research. She has received awards including the 2014 AICChemical Pioneer Award "for her outstanding contributions towards advancing the science of chemistry and impacting the chemical profession" and the 2009 Paul D. Saltman Award for Metals in Biology for "outstanding contributions to the field of metals in biology" and "groundbreaking work on the structures and reactions of complexes containing titanium."

Education

Valentine earned a bachelor's of science in chemistry from the University of Virginia in 1993. As an undergraduate, she researched aluminum inhibition of magnesium-dependent enzymes with Timothy L. Macdonald. She studied with Stephen J. Lippard at the Massachusetts Institute of Technology and earned her PhD in 1998.

Career

From 1998-2001, Valentine worked with Stephen J. Benkovic as a postdoctoral fellow at Pennsylvania State University. She published on the topics of enzyme kinetics, metallo-beta-lactamase, and the mechanics of replisome and primase in DNA replication.

In 2001, Valentine joined the chemistry faculty of Yale University. During her years there, she was able to begin research into the biological role of titanium, a question which she had long found intriguing. Valentine had become interested in the element early in her graduate career: in the early 1990s, titanium was not recognized as important in bioinorganic chemistry, but was believed by some (including her advisor) to be a candidate for future investigation.

In 2011, Valentine became an associate professor at Temple University where she specializes in environmental, material, and medicinal aspects of inorganic and biological chemistry. Her research group focuses on bioinorganic chemistry, especially nicatransferrin, Ti4+ ions, and biotitanification.

Outreach and mentorship

Valentine has participated in the Philadelphia Area Girls Enjoying Science (PAGES) and Temple Minority Access to Research Careers (MARC) programs. Via the Temple Teaching and Learning Center, she has acted as a mentor for students in high-attrition courses.

Awards and honors
 2014, American Institute of Chemists Chemical Pioneer Award
 2009, Paul D. Saltman Award for Metals in Biology
 2007, American Chemical Society PROGRESS/Dreyfus Lectureship Award
 2006, American Cancer Society Research Scholar Award
 2004, National Science Foundation CAREER award
 2003, Research Corporation Research Innovation Award
 2015 and 2021, Honors Professor of the Year.  2016, Dean's Distinguished Teaching Award, Temple University

References

Bioinorganic chemists
21st-century American chemists
American women chemists
University of Virginia alumni
Massachusetts Institute of Technology alumni
Yale University faculty
Temple University faculty
Living people
Year of birth missing (living people)
American women academics
21st-century American women scientists